Jörg Bode may refer to:
Jörg Bode (politician) (born 1970), Deputy Prime Minister of Lower Saxony
Jörg Bode (footballer) (born 1969), German footballer